Real Ghosts Caught On Tape is the third full-length album from the rock band Fake Problems. It released on September 21, 2010 and is their second release for Side One Dummy since joining the label in November 2008.  The song Soulless was used in an Android Application commercial.

Track listing
 "ADT" (Agoraphobic Dance Tune)
 "5678"
 "Songs for Teenagers"
 "RSVP"
 "Soulless"
 "Complaint Dept."
 "Done with Fun"
 "The Magazines"
 "White Lies"
 "Grand Finale"
 "Ghost to Coast"
 "The Gun" (iTunes Bonus Track)

Album personnel
 Chris Farren - Vocals and Guitar
 Derek Perry - Bass
 Sean Stevenson - Drums
 Casey Lee - Guitar
 Mae Whitman - Guest Vocals
 Alia Shawkat - Guest Vocals
 Harry Trumfio - Steel Drums

References

2010 albums
Fake Problems albums
SideOneDummy Records albums